Susannah Willard Johnson (February 20, 1729/30 – November 27, 1810) was an Anglo-American woman who was captured with her family during an Abenaki Indian raid on Charlestown, New Hampshire in August 1754, just after the outbreak of the French and Indian War. Johnson and her family were marched for weeks through the wilderness of New England and Quebec before arriving at the Abenaki village in Saint-François-du-Lac, Quebec. The Johnsons were held for ransom until being sold off into slavery to the French.

After her release in 1758, Johnson returned to her home in Charlestown.  Beginning in 1796, she recorded a full account of her ordeal. The first edition of her narrative was composed by John Curtis Chamberlain (using information from Johnson's oral testimony and notes) and appeared in small circulation later that year; subsequent editions were revised and edited by Johnson and published in 1807, and posthumously in 1814. Her harrowing memoir, although not the first work in the captivity narrative genre, was among the most widely read and studied accounts. It was republished numerous times in following years. Elizabeth George Speare's 1957 historical fiction children's novel, Calico Captive, was inspired by Johnson's story.

Biography
Susannah Willard was born in Turkey Hills, Lunenburg, Massachusetts to Lieutenant Moses Willard, Sr. (c. 1702 – June 18, 1756) and Susanna (née Hastings) Willard (April 4, 1710 – May 5, 1797). Her father, who was killed in 1756 by Indians while repairing a fence, was a descendant of Major Simon Willard, an early settler who had negotiated and purchased Concord, Massachusetts from the local Native Americans.

Susannah Johnson's mother was a descendant of Thomas Hastings, an English puritan who had immigrated to New England in 1634 during the Great Migration.

Susannah had twelve siblings in all: Aaron, John, Miriam, Moses, r., James Nutting, Jemima, Mary, Elizabeth, Abigail, and Huldah Willard. In 1742, Moses Willard and his wife relocated to Fort at Number 4, the northernmost British settlement along the Connecticut River, in what is now Charlestown. His children, including Susannah, joined him at No. 4 in June 1749. By then, only five other families had settled in the sparsely populated area.

Susannah was married to Captain James Johnson in Lunenburg on June 15, 1747. Following his death, she married a second time in 1762 to John Hastings, Jr. (d. November 21, 1804). At the time of the August 1754 raid, Johnson had three children, but mothered fourteen children in all, having seven children with James and seven with John. In order from oldest to youngest, they were: Sylvanus, Susanna, Mary "Polly", and Elizabeth Johnson; and Theodosia, Randilla, and Susanna Hastings, as well as seven other infants who died during birth or from disease.

After her release from captivity, Susannah Johnson lived in Lancaster, Massachusetts until October 1759, moving to Charlestown later that month and settling on her late husband's estate. She opened a small store to support her family, which she tended to for two years before marrying her second husband. She died on November 27, 1810 in Langdon and was buried at Forest Hill Cemetery in Charlestown.

Honors
A monument was erected at the cemetery on August 30, 1870 by some of Johnson's relatives and descendants. During the monument's dedication, a historical address was given by Reverend Benjamin Labaree, who later served as president of Middlebury College from 1840 until 1866. The monument stands near the graves of Susannah and James Johnson in the Briggs Hill Road area of the cemetery.

Abenaki raid
In 1749, an uneasy peace had been declared between the French and British, and by 1753 attacks against the township of No. 4 by Abenaki and Mohawk, who were allied with the French, had largely subsided. A year later surfacing rumors of war panicked the colonists, but the townsfolk were put at ease following the return of Captain James Johnson from a trading trip on August 24, 1754. While trading in Connecticut (having left his wife, Susannah, and three children behind at the No. 4), Johnson had been informed that war was not expected until at least the following spring. Feeling relieved and cheerful that they would have time to relocate to Northfield, New Hampshire before then, the family invited their neighbors to dinner and held a party late into the night of August 29.

During the early hours of August 30, while the Johnsons were sound asleep, an armed Abenaki party raided the enclosed stockade of Fort No. 4, abducting Susannah Johnson, her husband, their three children: 6-year-old Sylvanus, 4-year-old Susanna, and 2-year-old Polly, as well as Susannah Johnson's 14-year-old sister, Miriam Willard. Also among the captives were the Johnsons' neighbors, Peter Labarree and his hired servant, Ebenezer Farnsworth. The Indians looted whatever food they could find before setting fire to the Johnsons' home.

At the time of the attack, Susannah was nine months pregnant.  The following day, as the party was marching through the wilderness of what is now northeast Reading, Vermont, she gave birth to a daughter, whom she named Elizabeth Captive Johnson. Johnson was given a pair of moccasins and allowed to ride a stolen horse belonging to Captain Phineas Stevens, a noted colonist who had served as commander of the Fort's militia until 1750. The horse, named Scoggin and captured the night before, was killed and eaten during the journey after the party had run out of food; the Indians made a soup from the bone marrow while the captives were allowed to eat the flesh.

After arriving at St. Francis on September 19, with a full three weeks of journey behind them, the captives, whose faces had been decorated in vermilion paint, were forced to run the gauntlet past a parade of Abenaki warriors armed with tomahawks, war clubs, and knives. While the prisoners expected a severe beating or death, Johnson wrote in her accounts that she was "agreeably disappointed" when she realized that "each Indian only gave us a tap on the shoulder"; the Indians especially treated the women "decently" and none among them was seriously harmed. The captives were held for approximately two and a half months, long enough for Johnson to develop an elementary vocabulary of Abenaki words.

Incarceration
One by one the captives were taken to Montreal to be sold to the French, starting with James Johnson and followed by Peter Labarree, Ebenezer Farnsworth, Miriam Willard, and Johnson's two oldest daughters, Susanna and Polly. By October 15, 1754, Susannah Johnson, along with her infant daughter, Elizabeth, and her son, Sylvanus, were the only prisoners still held at the Abenaki village. In mid-November, Susannah and Elizabeth were sold to a French household, and eventually arrived in Montreal, where they were able to rejoin their family. Sylvanus was left behind at the Abenaki village, having apparently been adopted by the Indians and prevented from leaving.

James was soon granted a two-month parole, an opportunity he used to travel to New York in an attempt to raise funds for his family's ransom. He was unable to return in time, violating his parole. Upon his return to Quebec City in late July 1755, he and his wife, along with daughters Polly and Elizabeth, were detained and held in a jail, where "conditions were too shocking for description." (Johnson's eldest daughter, Susanna, was under the care of "three affluent old maids" and was never incarcerated.) The family remained imprisoned from July 1755 to July 1757—six months were spent in a criminal jail and the remainder in civil prison. During this time, all of the Johnsons had contracted smallpox.  In December 1756 Susannah gave birth to a son, although he "lived but a few hours, and was buried under the Cathedral Church."

In late June 1757, Susannah received a letter stating that her petitioning of the governor for their release had been successful. Her sister, Miriam, was allowed to rejoin her, and it was arranged for the women to be sent to England in exchange for French prisoners. (While Susannah, Miriam, Polly, and Elizabeth were all sent to England, James was not granted permission to leave and continued to fulfill his remaining prison sentence.)

Release
On July 20, Susannah Johnson boarded an England-bound vessel in Quebec with her two daughters and sister. The next morning, the ship sailed down the St. Lawrence River and entered the Atlantic, finally arriving in Plymouth on August 19. The family stayed at Plymouth a fortnight, later sailing to Portsmouth, and from Portsmouth to Cork, before finally boarding a packet ship en route to New York. They arrived at Sandy Hook on December 10, 1757—the first time in more than three years and three months the family had returned their native country. From there they traveled to Lancaster, where Susannah Johnson reunited with her husband on January 1, 1758. However, as James Johnson's legal troubles for violating his parole were still unresolved—complicated due to his rank of captain in the British militia—he soon traveled back to New York to "adjust his Canada accounts," and, while there, was "persuaded by Gov. Pownal to take a Captain's commission, and join the forces bound for Ticonderoga." James Johnson was killed on July 8, 1758 at the Battle of Carillon.

The eldest of Susannah Johnson's children, Sylvanus, who was 6 years old at the time of the raid, was adopted by the Abenaki.  He did not see his mother again until he was ransomed in October 1758 for "the sum of five hundred livres." He was subsequently brought to Northampton, Massachusetts by then-Major Israel Putnam, where he was finally reunited with his mother. Johnson wrote that Sylvanus, by then aged 11, was almost completely Indianized, having long forgotten the English language.  Fluent in Abenaki and conversational in French, he was fully accustomed to Abenaki life. While he was gradually reassimilated and his Indian habits "wore off by degrees", he maintained certain Abenaki customs until the end of his life.

Susannah Johnson's eldest daughter, Susanna, was eventually reunited with her family after the French surrendered Montreal in September 1760.

Peter Labaree made an escape from the French in the early spring of 1757, traveling several hundred miles from Montreal to Albany, New York by foot, before finally arriving at his home in Charlestown in the winter. During his journey, Labaree traveled only at night in order to avoid detection and capture by the Natives, at one point apparently traversing a swamp over a period of three days. Ebenezer Farnsworth reached his home at No. 4 some time before the rest of the captives, although the exact circumstances of his release or escape are not known.

Captivity narrative
In 1796, a full forty-two years after her capture by Indians, Johnson decided to record an account of her ordeal. Using her surviving letters, notes and diary, as well the memories of her family and fellow captives Labarree and Farnsworth, she dictated her account to Charlestown lawyer John Curtis Chamberlain, who ghostwrote the first edition (with the possible collaboration of Joseph Dennie and Royall Tyler). Titled A Narrative of the Captivity of Mrs. Johnson, it was printed by Isaiah Thomas and David Carlisle in 1796 in Walpole, New Hampshire. A second edition, expanded and revised by Johnson herself, was published in 1807 and printed by Alden Spooner in Windsor, Vermont.

By the winter of 1810, Johnson was nearing the end of her life. She had finished a new chapter for her narrative as late as September 1810, and was "very anxious" to have the "considerably enlarged" third edition published before her death; her efforts, however, proved unfruitful. When it was finally printed four years later in Windsor by Thomas M. Pomeroy, literature on Indian captivity was fairly common, and numerous collections were in mass circulation, such as 1808's A Selection of Some of the Most Interesting Narratives of Outrages Committed by the Indians by Archibald Loudon. Despite this, her authentic account, which was considered one of the most accurate and riveting, became widely read and studied.

Johnson's memoir was originally published in England in pamphlet form under the title The Captive American (Newcastle: M. Angus, 1797, and Air: Printed by J. and P. Wilson, 1802), as well as in Scotland under the original title (Glasgow: Printed by R. Chapman for Stewart & Meikle, 1797). It has since been reproduced numerous times in the United States and Britain. The narrative has also been translated into French and published in Quebec under the title Récit d'une captive en Nouvelle-France, 1754–1760 (Sillery: Septentrion, 2003, trans. Louis Tardivel).

Publication history

See also
 Calico Captive
 Captivity narrative
 Fort at Number 4
 Franco-Indian alliance

Notes

References
Footnotes

Bibliography

Further reading

External links
Online texts
Public domain digitized copies of Johnson's narrative:
1st edition (1796) at Canadiana.ca
2nd edition (1807) at Canadiana.ca
3rd edition (1814) at Canadiana.ca — Also 
 4th edition (1834) at Canadiana.ca — Also  — And 
5th edition (1841) at Canadiana.ca

Other information

The Fort at Number 4 — Web site for the open-air museum; provides historical information on No. 4 and the families that lived there
 Descendants of Thomas Hastings website
 Descendants of Thomas Hastings on Facebook

1730 births
1810 deaths
Writers of captivity narratives
Captives of Native Americans
American memoirists
Colonial American women
18th-century American writers
19th-century American writers
19th-century American women writers
Writers from Massachusetts
Writers from New Hampshire
People from Lunenburg, Massachusetts
People of colonial New Hampshire
People of colonial Massachusetts
People of New Hampshire in the French and Indian War
Women in 18th-century warfare
American people of English descent
Colonial American women in warfare
People from Charlestown, New Hampshire
People from Langdon, New Hampshire
American women memoirists
American Puritans
18th-century American women writers